Brydee Moore (born 1 May 1990) is an Australian  athlete with cerebral palsy that competes in the shot put, discus and javelin. She won a silver medal at the 2015 IPC Athletics World Championships. She represented Australia at the 2016 Rio Paralympics in athletics.

Personal
Moore was born on 1 May 1990 in Melbourne. and has cerebral palsy.

Career

Moore started athletics at the age of seven as she wanted to participate in Saturday sport like her sisters. Her first major international competition was the 2006 FESPIC Games in Kuala Lumpur where she won two gold medals. She competed in the 2008 Summer Paralympics in the seated shot put, discus and javelin events as an eighteen-year-old.  She finished thirteen in the women's javelin throw (F33/34/52/53) event.  She trained with Madeleine Hogan in the lead up to the Games.  At the Games, she was coached by John Eden. She competed in the 2010 Commonwealth Games.  In the women's severe to moderate quadriplegia/cerebral palsy shot put event, she threw a distance of 5.85 metres. At the 2012 London Paralympics she finished sixth in the Women's Shot Put F32-34 with a throw of 6.05m and tenth in the Women's Javelin F33-34/52-53 with 10.55m.

Moore won her first international medal by winning the silver medal in the Women's Shot Put F33 at the 2015 IPC Athletics World Championships in Doha with a season best throw of 5.20m. Moore originally finished third but a disqualification moved her to second. After winning the silver medal, Moore said: "This is a dream come true. I never thought this would happen. I always thought I had a chance, but I honestly can’t believe it. The only way is up now. I can only get better from here and hopefully that means an even better result in Rio next year. It’s really exciting. This shows that I can do the same things that everybody else can, just in a different way. I’ve proved that tonight and I am so proud of myself for getting out there and being my best."

Her philosophy is "see the athlete not the disability".

Moore competed in the 2016 Rio Paralympics placing fifth in the Women's F33 Shot put event.

At the 2017 World Para Athletics Championships in London, England, she was fifth in the Women's Shot Put F33 with a throw of 4.40m.

She is a Victorian Institute of Sport scholarship holder.

Recognition
2006 - Variety Club's Junior Sportsperson Award 
2004 and 2005 - Best Female Athlete, Wheelchair Sports Victoria

References

External links
 
 
 Brydee Moore at Athletics Australia
 Brydee Moore at Australian Athletics Historical Results
 

1990 births
Living people
Australian female shot putters
Australian female discus throwers
Australian female javelin throwers
Paralympic athletes of Australia
Athletes (track and field) at the 2008 Summer Paralympics
Athletes (track and field) at the 2010 Commonwealth Games
Athletes (track and field) at the 2012 Summer Paralympics
Athletes (track and field) at the 2016 Summer Paralympics
Cerebral Palsy category Paralympic competitors
Track and field athletes with cerebral palsy
Sportswomen from Victoria (Australia)
Commonwealth Games competitors for Australia
21st-century Australian women